Johann Heinrich Westphal (January 31, 1794 – 1831) was a German astronomer.  Not to be confused with J. G. Westphal, who discovered the lost periodic comet 20D/Westphal in 1852.

He was born in Schwerin. His professional career was spent mostly in Italy. He translated Giuseppe Piazzi's Lezioni elementari di astronomia ad use del real osservatorio di Palermo into German. He died in Sicily.

1794 births
1831 deaths
19th-century German astronomers